Ivo Ferdinand Rinkel (27 October 1920 – 16 March 2000) was a Dutch tennis and field hockey player who was active in the 1940s and 50s.

Career
Ivo Rinkel won the 1945 Dutch championship singles title. Partnered with Huib Wilton and Hans van Swol he won six national doubles titles between 1945 and 1950 as well as mixed doubles titles in 1946 and 1950. Rinkel participated in six Wimbledon Championships between 1946 and 1952. With Van Swol he reached the quarterfinals of the men's doubles competition in 1948. His best result in the singles competition came in 1946 when he reached the third round in which he lost to Frenchman Pierre Pellizza.

In 1947 he won the triple crown at the British Covered Court Championships played at the Queen's Club in London. In the singles final he defeated Ernest Wittman in three sets. Together with R.E. Carter he won the men's doubles title defeating H. Billington and Ignacy Tłoczyński in the final. In the mixed doubles he was partnered with Mrs. P.J. Halford and in the final they proved too strong for John Olliff and Peggy Dawson-Scott. 
Between 1946 and 1952 he played in ten ties for the Dutch Davis Cup team comprising a record of seven wins and five losses.

Rinkel played field hockey for the Gooische Hockey Club. In 1950–1951 he was a member of the Dutch national hockey team.  After his active sports career Rinkel became captain of the Netherlands Davis Cup team.

Personal life
He married British tennis player Jean Quertier on 28 February 1952 in Roehampton and the couple had two daughters.

References

External links

 
 
 

1920 births
2000 deaths
Dutch male tennis players
People from Semarang